Västra Götaland County South  is one of the 29 multi-member constituencies of the Riksdag, the national legislature of Sweden. The constituency was established as Älvsborg County South in 1970 when the Riksdag changed from a bicameral legislature to a unicameral legislature. It was renamed Västra Götaland County South in 1998 when the counties of Älvsborg, Gothenburg and Bohus and Skaraborg were merged to create Västra Götaland. The constituency consists of the municipalities of Bollebygd, Borås, Herrljunga, Mark, Svenljunga, Tranemo, Ulricehamn and Vårgårda. The constituency currently elects seven of the 349 members of the Riksdag using the open party-list proportional representation electoral system. At the 2022 general election it had 170,107 registered electors.

Electoral system
Västra Götaland County North currently elects eight of the 349 members of the Riksdag using the open party-list proportional representation electoral system. Constituency seats are allocated using the modified Sainte-Laguë method. Only parties that that reach the 4% national threshold and parties that receive at least 12% of the vote in the constituency compete for constituency seats. Supplementary leveling seats may also be allocated at the constituency level to parties that reach the 4% national threshold.

Election results

Summary

(Excludes leveling seats)

Detailed

2020s

2022
Results of the 2022 general election held on 11 September 2022:

The following candidates were elected:
 Constituency seats - Anders Alftberg (SD), 126 votes; Jan Ericson (M), 1,083 votes; Patrik Jönsson (SD), 0 votes; Mikael Larsson (C), 572 votes; Petter Löberg (S), 1,339 votes; Ulrik Nilsson (M), 438 votes; and Jessica Rodén (S), 1,065 votes.
 Leveling seats - Ingemar Kihlström (KD), 210 votes.

2010s

2018
Results of the 2018 general election held on 9 September 2018:

The following candidates were elected:
 Constituency seats - Ann-Christin Ahlberg (S), 1,748 votes; Jan Ericson (M), 760 votes; Patrik Jönsson (SD), 2 votes; Mikael Larsson (C), 826 votes; Petter Löberg (S), 1,017 votes; Caroline Nordengrip (SD), 181 votes; and Cecilie Tenfjord-Toftby (M), 1,799 votes.
 Leveling seats - Ingemar Kihlström (KD), 102 votes.

2014
Results of the 2014 general election held on 14 September 2014:

The following candidates were elected:
 Constituency seats - Ann-Christin Ahlberg (S), 948 votes; Phia Andersson (S), 958 votes; Jan Ericson (M), 1,073 votes; Petter Löberg (S), 1,231 votes; Cecilie Tenfjord-Toftby (M), 1,655 votes; and Kristina Winberg (SD), 15 votes.

2010
Results of the 2010 general election held on 19 September 2010:

The following candidates were elected:
 Constituency seats - Ann-Christin Ahlberg (S), 1,131 votes; Phia Andersson (S), 1,316 votes; Jan Ericson (M), 1,221 votes; Ulrik Nilsson (M), 966 votes Hans Olsson (S), 422 votes; and Cecilie Tenfjord-Toftby (M), 1,684 votes.

2000s

2006
Results of the 2006 general election held on 17 September 2006:

The following candidates were elected:
 Constituency seats - Ann-Christin Ahlberg (S), 1,287 votes; Phia Andersson (S), 1,191 votes; Jan Ericson (M), 740 votes; Hans Olsson (S), 455 votes; Ulf Sjösten (M), 2,726 votes; and Claes Västerteg (C), 643 votes.
 Leveling seats - Else-Marie Lindgren (KD), 756 votes.

2002
Results of the 2002 general election held on 15 September 2002:

The following candidates were elected:
 Constituency seats - Berndt Ekholm (S), 922 votes; Anne-Marie Ekström (FP), 774 votes; Sonja Fransson (S), 1,555 votes; Arne Kjörnsberg (S), 3,055 votes; Else-Marie Lindgren (KD), 1,321 votes; and Ulf Sjösten (M), 2,449 votes. 
 Leveling seats - Claes Västerteg (C), 776 votes.

1990s

1998
Results of the 1998 general election held on 20 September 1998:

The following candidates were elected:
 Constituency seats - Lars Björkman (M), 2,310 votes; Berndt Ekholm (S), 1,253 votes; Kjell Eldensjö (KD), 320 votes; Sonja Fransson (S), 1,873 votes; Arne Kjörnsberg (S), 2,651 votes; and Jonas Ringqvist (V), 79 votes.

1994
Results of the 1994 general election held on 18 September 1994:

1991
Results of the 1991 general election held on 15 September 1991:

1980s

1988
Results of the 1988 general election held on 18 September 1988:

1985
Results of the 1985 general election held on 15 September 1985:

1982
Results of the 1982 general election held on 19 September 1982:

1970s

1979
Results of the 1979 general election held on 16 September 1979:

1976
Results of the 1976 general election held on 19 September 1976:

1973
Results of the 1973 general election held on 16 September 1973:

1970
Results of the 1970 general election held on 20 September 1970:

References

Riksdag constituencies
Riksdag constituencies established in 1970
Riksdag constituency, South